Garba Lame (born 2 March 1968) is a Nigerian wrestler. He competed in the men's freestyle 52 kg at the 1988 Summer Olympics.

References

1968 births
Living people
Nigerian male sport wrestlers
Olympic wrestlers of Nigeria
Wrestlers at the 1988 Summer Olympics
Place of birth missing (living people)
20th-century Nigerian people